This is a list of Iranian film directors representing various genres and periods of Iranian cinema.

A 
 Narges Abyar
Saber Abar
 Ali Abbasi
 Mostafa Abdollahi
 Mohammad Ahmadi
 Mania Akbari
 Shahram Alidi
 Reza Allamehzadeh
 Cyrus Alvand
 Mohsen Amiryoussefi
 Kiarash Anvari
 Abolfazl Attar
 Reza Attaran
 Kianoush Ayari

B 
 Reza Badiyi
 Maziar Bahari
 Ramin Bahrani
 Parisa Bakhtavar
 Rakhshan Bani-E'temad
 Bahram Bayzai
 Marzieh Boroumand
 Shiva Boloorian

C 
 Henri Charr

D 
 Hajir Darioush
 Masoud Dehnamaki
 Pouran Derakhshandeh

E 
 Nader Ebrahimi
 Tanaz Eshaghian
 Matt Eskandari

F 
 Mitra Farahani
 Asghar Farhadi
 Bahman Farmanara
 Mohammad Farokhmanesh
 Hamid Farrokhnezhad
 Forough Farrokhzad
 Aryana Farshad
 Sepideh Farsi
 Hassan Fathi
 Reza Fazeli
 Sadaf Foroughi

G 
 Kamran Ghadakchian
 Iraj Ghaderi
 Shahyar Ghanbari
 Tina Gharavi
 Behrouz Gharibpour
 Regis Ghezelbash
 Bahman Ghobadi
 Fereydun Gole
 Ebrahim Golestan

H 
 Mani Haghighi
 Hassan Hajgozar
 Ali Hatami
 Ebrahim Hatamikia
 Manijeh Hekmat
 Mohammad-Reza Honarmand
 Robert Hossein
 Bozorgmehr Hosseinpour
 Hassan Hajgozar

J 
 Masoud Jafari Jozani
 Abolfazl Jalili
 Rambod Javan
Mehdi Jafari
Vahid Jalilvand
Nima Javidi

K 
 Sara Khaki
Abdolreza Kahani
 Narges Kalhor
 Fariborz Kamkari
 Cyrus Kar
 Varuzh Karim-Masihi
 Niki Karimi
 Nosrat Karimi
 Maryam Keshavarz
 Samuel Khachikian
 Valiollah Khakdan
 Loghman Khaledi
 Abbas Kiarostami
 Bahman Kiarostami
 Masoud Kimiai
 Parviz Kimiavi
 Alexis Kouros
 Esmail Koushan
 Sadegh Karamyar
Mohammad Kart

L 
 Ali Limonadi
 Gholamhussein Lotfi

M 
 Reza Mirkarimi
 Majid Majidi
 Hana Makhmalbaf
 Mohsen Makhmalbaf
 Samira Makhmalbaf
 Yassamin Maleknasr
 Asghar Massombagi
 Dariush Mehrjui
 Marzieh Meshkini
 Tahmineh Milani
 Maziar Miri
 Mehran Modiri
 Mahnaz Mohammadi
 Shahram Mokri
 Granaz Moussavi
 Rasoul Mollagholipour
 Esfandiar Monfaredzadeh
 Ali Mosaffa
 Bahman Motamedian
 Duraid Munajim
 Mohammad Hossein Mahdavian

N 
 Amir Naderi
 Shirin Neshat
 Parviz Nouri
 Mohammad Nourizad
 Hossein Nuri

O 
 Ovanes Ohanian

P 
 Jafar Panahi
 Kambuzia Partovi
 Babak Payami
 Rafi Pitts
 Kiumars Poorahmad
 Ali Pourtash
Tina Pakravan

R 
 Hossein Rajabian
 Iraj Raminfar
 Rouzbeh Rashidi
 Amir Shahab Razavian
 Shahla Riahi
 Jamil Rostami
 Mohammad Rasoulof
 Saeed Roustayi

S 
 Hamid Samandarian
 Houman Seyyedi
 Hossein Shahabi
 Parviz Shahbazi
 Sohrab Shahid-Saless
 Javad Shamaqdari
 Siamak Shayeghi
 Kamran Shirdel
 Mohammad Shirvani
 Daryush Shokof
 Khosrow Sinai

T 
 Kamal Tabrizi
 Nasser Taghvaei
 Hamid Tamjidi
 Susan Taslimi
 Farkhondeh Torabi

Y 
 Hassan Yektapanah

Z 
 Mona Zandi Haghighi

See also
 Iranian cinema
 Persian theatre
 List of Iranian cinematographers
 List of Iranian films

References

External links
 Film International. Iranian Film Quarterly
 Iranian Film directors on IMDb
 Kiarostami and Makhmalbaf among The world's 40 best directors
 Women of Iranian Popular Cinema
 Nantes festival director calls Iranian cinema one of world’s best
 Faces. Short biographies of some Iranian actors and film directors, Film International

Iran